HMS E4 was a British E class submarine built by Vickers, Barrow-in-Furness, costing £101,900. E4 was laid down on 16 May 1911, launched on 5 February 1912 and commissioned on 28 January 1913. On 24 September 1915 E4 was attacked by the German airship SL3. On 15 August 1916, she collided with sister ship  during exercises off Harwich. Both ships sank and there were only 14 survivors, all from E41. Both boats were raised, repaired and recommissioned. She was sold on 21 February 1922 to the Upnor Ship Breaking Company.

Design

The early 'Group 1' E class boats were armed with four 18 inch (450 mm) torpedo tubes, one in the bow, one either side amidships, and one in the stern; a total of eight torpedoes were carried. Group 1 boats were not fitted with a deck gun during construction, but those involved in the Dardanelles campaign had guns mounted forward of the conning tower while at Malta Dockyard.

E-Class submarines had wireless systems with  power ratings; in some submarines, these were later upgraded to  systems by removing a midship torpedo tube. Their maximum design depth was  although in service some reached depths of below . Some submarines contained Fessenden oscillator systems.

The complement was three officers and 28 men.

Service history

On commissioning, E4 joined the 8th Submarine Flotilla as part of the Home Fleets, and was inspected by King George V at Portsmouth.

E4 remained part of the 8th Submarine Flotilla, based at Portsmouth on the eve of the outbreak of the First World War in August 1914. The planned duties of the 8th Flotilla in times of war was offensive operations in the North Sea, operating from Harwich, and the Flotilla was duly deployed to Harwich at the start of August. On 19 August, E4, together with the submarines  and  set out from Harwich for a patrol in the North Sea. On 20 August the three submarines were spotted by German torpedo boats west of Helgoland - the sighting resulted in a planned sortie by German cruisers and torpedo boats against British fishing boats on the Dogger Bank being delayed for a day.

On 28 August 1914, E4 was one of eight submarines that took part in a raid against the German Heligoland Bight patrol by the Harwich Force. Three submarines were deployed as bait, with orders to try and get spotted by the German outer screen in order to draw German torpedo boat patrols into the clutches of British destroyers and light cruisers. E4 spotted the German torpedo boat  being chased by British destroyers but could not get into a position to attack before V187 was sunk by the British destroyers. Shortly afterwards, the German cruiser  arrived, forcing the British destroyers to disperse, and although E4 attempted to attack Stettin, the submarine could not get into a good attack position before Stettin left. A little later, E4 surfaced and picked up the crew of two boats from the destroyer , which were rescuing survivors from V187 when the arrival of Stettin caused the boats to be left behind. E4, short of space, also picked up three German survivors, leaving the remainder in a boat with provisions and a compass. On 10 September, E4 took part in another raid by the Harwich Force, supported by the Grand Fleet against German forces in the Helgoland Bight. E-4 attempted to torpedo the German submarines, but both her torpedoes missed.

On 21 May 1915, E4 left Harwich to patrol North of Helgoland, to attack German minesweepers which were thought to be clearing a British minefield. E4 was attacked by the German airship L10 on 24 May, but the attack was unsuccessful. Also on 24 May, E4 fired a pair of torpedoes at long range against a patrol of German torpedo boats, with the torpedoes missing. On 29 May, during E4s journey home, she was attacked unsuccessfully by a German seaplane. On 24 July, E4 set out on a patrol off the Horns Reef, and later that day sighted a submarine near the North Hinder lightvessel. E4 fired one torpedo at the submarine, ran under the German submarine, which dived away. On 28 July E4 was attacked off Horns Reef by two German Vorpostenboot, Senator von Berenburg Goszler and Harry Busse. E4 responded by torpedoing and sinking Berenburg. E4 picked up 11 survivors from the sunken trawler, taking three of them prisoner, and landing the others on the Horns Reef lightvessel.

In September 1915, E4 was one of a number of submarines fitted with four 6-pounder anti-aircraft guns for use against German airships. On 1 September, E4 and E6 set out from Harwich to the Western side of the German Bight on an anti-Zeppelin patrol. While E4 saw no German airships on that patrol, she did capture the German trawler Esteburg which was sent back to Harwich. On 14 September, E4 and E6 set out on another anti-Zeppelin patrol. On 21 September, E4 encountered the German airship SL 3. E4 opened fire on the airship with her anti-aircraft guns, but this did not deter SL 3, and E4 dived to safety just before the airship dropped three bombs. Both submarine and airship were undamaged. On 2 April 1916, E4, one of three submarines searching for the destroyer , which was adrift at sea after being abandoned earlier that month, encountered a German submarine but failed to close to an attack position. E4, by now fitted with two 3-inch (76 mm) anti-aircraft guns, continued to carry out anti-Zeppelin patrols in May 1916, being near-missed by two bombs dropped by a German airship on 20 May.

On 15 August 1916, submarines of the 8th Submarine Flotilla were training off Harwich, with  acting as a target to allow the other submarines to practice attacking submarines. E41 was running on the surface at  when the submerged E4 passed in front of E41. Although E41s crew saw E4s periscope and attempted evasive action, E4 rammed E41 and sank immediately with the loss of all 33 aboard, while E41 sank within 90 seconds, with 18 killed and 15 rescued by the destroyer . Both submarines were salvaged and returned to service, with E4 being listed as part of the 9th Submarine Flotilla, also based at Harwich, from October 1916.  E4 remained part of the 9th Flotilla until the end of the war, although she was noted as being paid off in December 1918.

E4 was sold for scrap to the Upnor Ship Breaking Company of Upnor on 21 February 1922.

Notes

References

Bibliography

External links
 'Submarine losses 1904 to present day' - Royal Navy Submarine Museum 

 

British E-class submarines of the Royal Navy
Ships built in Barrow-in-Furness
1912 ships
World War I submarines of the United Kingdom
Royal Navy ship names
Maritime incidents in 1916
Submarines sunk in collisions
World War I shipwrecks in the North Sea
British submarine accidents
Warships lost with all hands